The first wave of Walt Disney Treasures was released on December 4, 2001. It includes four different DVD sets.

Mickey Mouse in Living Color

This set covers the first leg of Mickey Mouse's color career, from 1935 to 1938.

150,000 sets produced.

Disc one

1935
The Band Concert
Mickey's Garden
On Ice
Pluto's Judgement Day
Mickey's Fire Brigade

1936
Thru the Mirror
Mickey's Circus
Mickey's Elephant
Mickey's Grand Opera
Mickey's Polo Team
Alpine Climbers
Moving Day
Mickey's Rival
Orphans' Picnic

Bonus features
Parade of the Award Nominees (1932), a short made especially for the Academy Awards show
Pencil-test versions of Mickey's Fire Brigade, Pluto's Judgment Day and On Ice
Easter Egg: A clip from the Disneyland story appears as an Easter egg on this disc, it shows Disney talking about Mickey's creation reminding us that it all started with a mouse.

Disc two

1937
Hawaiian Holiday
Moose Hunters
The Worm Turns
Magician Mickey
Mickey's Amateurs
Clock Cleaners
Lonesome Ghosts

1938
Mickey's Parrot
Boat Builders
The Whalers
Mickey's Trailer
Brave Little Tailor

Bonus features
Mickey in Living Color with Leonard Maltin, a short biography of sorts on the early portion of Mickey's cartoon career
Mickey's Surprise Party (1939), Easter egg bonus, this cartoon was created for the 1939 New York World's Fair and was sponsored by Nabisco

Notes

The Clock Cleaners short on this release is the edited version. During the 1990s, Donald Wildmon and the American Family Association persuaded Wal-Mart to discontinue the sale of the VHS tape "Cartoon Classics: Fun on the Job!" which contained the film. The reason for this was that during his argument with the main spring in the adjacent image, Donald Duck allegedly shouts "Fuck you!" yet in Clarence Nash's semi intelligible voice, he actually says "Says who?", which is made clear by the spring's reply - "Says I!" Additionally the Motion Picture Production Code, popularly known as the "Hays Code," adopted in 1934, would never have allowed the language in the first place.

Due to this controversy, when the cartoon was included on the Walt Disney Treasures DVD set "Mickey Mouse in Living Color," Donald's line was redubbed as "Awww, nuts!", which was originally said in On Ice. However, the DVD release of Have a Laugh!, Volume 2 contains the cartoon with the original line reinstated, as well as its original RKO titles and illustrated title card.

Silly Symphonies

This set is more or less descriptive of "The Best of the Silly Symphonies", with the cartoons presented here in arranged by theme. The U.K. release, unlike the U.S. release, has the original "Jewish peddler" visuals restored to Three Little Pigs (although the original wolf dialogue as the Jewish peddler is not restored).

150,000 sets produced.

Disc one

Fables and Fairy Tales
Mother Goose Melodies (1931)
Babes in the Woods (1932)
Lullaby Land (1933)
The Flying Mouse (1934)
The Golden Touch (1935)
The Robber Kitten (1935)
The Tortoise and the Hare (1935)
The Country Cousin (1936)
Elmer Elephant (1936)

Favorite Characters
Three Little Pigs (1933)
The Big Bad Wolf (1934)
The Wise Little Hen (1934)
Three Little Wolves (1936)
Toby Tortoise Returns (1936)

Leonard's Picks
Three Little Pigs (1933)
The Flying Mouse (1934)
The Grasshopper and the Ants (1934)
The Tortoise and the Hare (1935)
Wynken, Blynken and Nod (1938)

Additional cartoons (via Easter eggs)
Water Babies (1935)
Who Killed Cock Robin? (1935)
The Practical Pig (1939)

Disc two

Nature on Screen
The Ugly Duckling (1931)
Birds of a Feather (1931)
The Busy Beavers (1931)
Just Dogs (1932)
Father Noah's Ark (1933)
Peculiar Penguins (1934)
Funny Little Bunnies (1934)
Mother Pluto (1936)
The Old Mill (1937)
The Ugly Duckling (1939)

Accent on Music
The Skeleton Dance (1929)
The China Plate (1931)
Egyptian Melodies (1931)
Flowers and Trees (1932)
The Cookie Carnival (1935)
Music Land (1935)
Woodland Café (1937)

Leonard's Picks
The Skeleton Dance (1929)
The Ugly Duckling (1931)
Flowers & Trees (1932)
Music Land (1935)
The Ugly Duckling (1939)

Additional cartoons (via Easter eggs)
The Old Mill (1937)
Farmyard Symphony (1938)

Bonus features
Songs of the Silly Symphonies: Leonard Maltin meets with Richard M. Sherman to discuss songs that appear in the Silly Symphonies, including "The World Owes Me a Livin'" and "Who's Afraid of the Big Bad Wolf?"
Silly Symphony Souvenirs: Leonard Maltin meets with Dave Smith at the Walt Disney Archives to discuss merchandise inspired by the series
Still galleries: Behind-the-scenes and promotional pictures of the Silly Symphony series

Notes
One sequence in the Three Little Pigs showed the Big Bad Wolf dressed as a Jewish peddler. This was re-animated in the 1940s so the Wolf would be a student working his way through college. The US release of this set features the edited version, whereas the UK release shows the original Jewish peddler. Both versions use the modified audio from the 1940s version.

Disneyland, USA

This set depicts various episodes of the Walt Disney anthology series that take place within and/or are about Disneyland. It includes also the very first episode from the series.

150,000 sets produced.

Disc one
The Disneyland Story: First broadcast on October 27, 1954.
Dateline Disneyland: First broadcast on July 17, 1955.

Disc two
Disneyland After Dark: First broadcast on April 15, 1962.
Disneyland 10th Anniversary: First broadcast on January 3, 1965.

Bonus features
Still gallery: This gallery shows off images of various Disneyland attractions' posters, past and present.
The Magic Kingdom and the Magic of Television: Although most of the content of this mini-history of Disneyland is repeated from other intros on these set with a montage of clips from all the episodes presented, it does feature some nuggets of information about Walt's view of the park as a tribute to Americana, his aspiration for the park to have the latest products technology and even a few world leaders that had visited the park.

Davy Crockett

This set contains the original five episodes of Davy Crockett which were first shown on the Walt Disney anthology series from 1954-1955. This miniseries was re-released as a DVD Two-Movie Set on September 7, 2004.

150,000 sets produced.

Disc one
Davy Crockett Indian Fighter: First broadcast on 15 December 1954.
Davy Crockett Goes to Congress: First broadcast on 16 January 1955.
Davy Crockett at the Alamo: First broadcast on 23 February 1955.

Disc two
Davy Crockett's Keelboat Race: First broadcast on 16 November 1955.
Davy Crockett and the River Pirates: First broadcast on 14 December 1955.

Bonus features
"A Conversation with Fess Parker": Leonard Maltin interviews Fess Parker, who played Davy in the episodes.
"The Davy Crockett Craze": Leonard Maltin interviews Paul F. Anderson, author of the book The Davy Crockett Craze.
Easter egg: "The Ballad of Davy Crockett": The famous ballad, sung by Fess Parker.
Still gallery: Stills from various aspects of the production.

References

1